Games Gamblers Play is a 1974 Hong Kong comedy film directed by and starring Michael Hui, with action direction by Sammo Hung. The film also co-stars Sam Hui, who also served as one of the film's music composers.

Although very successful and netting more than 6 millions Hong Kong dollars at the box offices, the film was criticized because there “gambling is no longer a social vice but a means by which one can get ahead quickly by achieving instant monetary gains. The concept of morality or righteousness is irrelevant: the utilitarian motive of individual accumulation of instant wealth is paramount.”

Plot

Man (Michael Hui) is a prison laborer who has a knack in conning others, which he uses to con other prisoners for their meals. Kit (Samuel Hui) is a novice con-man who has been caught stealing poker chips from another gambler in a casino. While in prison, Kit shares a cell with Man, where they both discover their common interest in pai gow. They start to have a friendship and decide to devise plans to con their way into wealth.

Sometime later, Man has been released from prison. He meets Kit outside, who was released earlier due to a shorter sentence. Kit tells Man about his plan to work together and gamble their way into riches, but Man expresses his concern about their lack of money before they can even begin to gamble. Kit assures Man that he has loaned some money from loan shark, albeit the very high interest charged by the loan shark. Man then tells Kit to arrange a game of pai gow and inform about the game.

Kit arranges a game of pai gow with some friends, including a wealthy man and his wife Pei-pei (Betty Ting). However, Kit has very poor luck during the game, and soon loses all his borrowed money. He desperately calls Man to come over and help him turn the tides, but Man refuses to come over, giving excuses that he has a stomachache, when in reality he just want to rest and relax. Having run out of money, Kit decides to leave the game and find Man. Pei-pei, on the other hand, played well in the game, and has won $7,000.

Kit spends the night trying to find Man, but without much luck since Man only gave him his telephone number. It is later revealed that Pei-pei is Man's mistress and that Man had been resting in her home. Pei-pei returns home to tell Man about the game, her winnings and Kit's losses. Man later discovers Pei-pei only has $1,000 with her and asks where is the rest of the $7,000. She then reveals she borrowed money from a notorious loan shark named Ching, who charges an exorbitant interest rate. She had no choice but to pay $6,000 to him as interest out of fear for her protection. Man is intrigued by this loan shark, and later leaves Pei-pei's residence with $1,000. He then spots Kit sitting outside Pei-pei's home, apparently having spent the whole night waiting for Man to show up.

Kit is worried about finding enough money to repay the loan shark he borrowed from. Man reassures him that it is easy to gamble and win more money to recover the debt, but soon loses the $1,000 after entering a gambling den. Man then decides to bring Kit to his own home to meet his younger sister Siu-mei (Lisa Lui) and his wife (Law Lan), who have been taking care of the house while Man was away in prison. Kit soon becomes attracted to Siu-mei. 

One evening, Kit watches a quiz show hosted by Wong But-man (James Wong), and is able to answer every question correctly. Siu-mei is impressed by Kit's knowledge, and suggests that Kit could win a lot of money by participating in the show. Over dinner, Man asks Kit about what he thought of his sister, and convinces Kit to go out on a date with her.

Kit eventually takes Siu-mei out on a date at the beach. While Siu-mei is changing her clothes in a changing room, Kit spots a group of gamblers playing poker nearby. He decides to con them by using his own cards to play a full house, but is soon exposed by one of them (Ricky Hui) who notices Kit's cards. Kit then becomes badly injured after being beaten up by the gamblers at the beach.

After a visit to the doctor, Siu-mei informs Kit that she has gotten tickets for him to participate in the quiz show and for herself and Man to spectate. However, due to Kit's injury, he refuses to participate and appear on TV with his injuries. It was later decided that Man will participate in Kit's place, with Kit and Siu-mei spectating. Initially, Man fumbles and does poorly for the first few questions, as he fails to understand the hints given to him by Kit. But later he starts to perform well when the following questions are related to poker. 

Having won some money from the quiz show, Man and Kit treat themselves to a spa. Kit suggests another scheme for them to get rich quickly - by strategically betting in greyhound racing. Man is initially skeptical by this plan due to the possibly low winnings and high risks in losing. Kit mentions a man he knows, Bully (Benz Hui), a former pimp who works as a debt-collector, who might have connections to get more money for betting. 

Kit spends the next few days planning a strategy to beat in greyhound racing. He eventually tells Man of his plan - by placing heavy bets on the hot pick while placing smaller bets on the rest of the rounds as a way to maximise their winnings from the hot pick and minimise their losses by betting on the other hounds as a safety net. While impressed by Kit's plan, Man then tells Kit that his plan might not work if the hot pick doesn't win, and especially if the bookies place their own bets on the hot pick that will greatly reduce the dividends and subsequently the winnings, since the only way to win big from the hot pick is drive up the dividends. Kit then wonders what if the bookies forgot to telephone and place in their own bets. Man and Kit later meets Bully, who reveals that he has been working for a notorious and influential loan shark named Ching, who operates a large illegal gambling den. Man and Kit decides to visit the gambling den to gamble.

Ching is shown to be a ruthless and violent loan shark, who regularly assaults his thugs for failing to meet standards, and even guests who have won too much in the gambling den. Kit loses some money while Man has won some money. They later meet Bully at a diner, who also tells Man that Ching enjoys playing Mahjong and often have the advantage of having extra tiles to win his opponents. Being a skilled Mahjong player himself, Man decides to have Bully arrange a Mahjong session with Ching and other regular players. 

During the Mahjong session, Man puts up a good fight with Ching and is able to see through many of Ching's tricks, allowing him to win a huge sum of money from a disgruntled Ching. At the same time, he notices a bookie in the gambling den transferring bets over a telephone, and remembers what Kit says about the possibility of bookies forgetting to telephone. He quickly realises that Kit's plan could actually work. He then decides to use the winnings and have Ching's bookie to bet on the hot pick as off-track betting. 

Man and Kit agree to do the following: Kit will go to the greyhound track in Macau to bet on the remaining hounds, while Man will find a way to disable the telephone lines of the gambling den to prevent bookies from transferring and placing their bets while the race is ongoing. Their plan seemingly succeeded, with Man winning $320,000 from an increasingly irate Ching. However, Man's act of disabling the telephone lines is discovered by a street bum, who later informs Ching about Man's actions. Infuriated, Ching sends his thugs to go after Man. 

Man's and Kit's happiness with their newly gotten gains is short-lived, after Bully notifies Man that Ching knows about Man sabotaging the telephone lines. Knowing that they are in danger, Man and Kit decide to hide in a resort. Seeing this as an opportunity to leave his wife and sister at home, Man also invites Pei-pei to the resort while hiding. However, Siu-mei and Man's wife also decide to come to the resort unannounced, as Man's wife knows that Man will be up to no good. She eventually catches Man and Pei-pei together in the hotel, resulting in an argument. In a bid to escape the ensuing argument, Man accidentally locks himself out of his hotel room, only to realise that Ching and his thugs have already tracked him to the resort. A long dramatic chase throughout the resort ensues, which involves barging through another hotel guest's (Lee Kwan) room, the lobby, a hairdressing salon, a Japanese restaurant and kitchen.   
          
The chase ultimately ends in the resort casino, where Man tries to blend in with other gamblers but to no avail. Man ends up running to a craps table to join a game. He then secretly switches the casino dice with his own dice to 'win' many rounds of craps, much to the astonishment of other players, the dealer and Ching. Man then admits to the dealer that he has cheated in the game as a desperate attempt to be arrested by security - Man would rather be arrested than falling into Ching's hands and losing the newly gained fortune. Kit, Siu-mei and Man's wife tries looking around for Man in the casino, only to see him being escorted away from the casino by security guards. Man is imprisoned in jail once again.

Some time has passed, and Man is released again. He meets Kit outside the prison, who is revealed to be married to Siu-mei. Kit starts telling Man about another gambling strategy that they could use to win more fortune, but Man disagrees with the plan by pointing out its many flaws. Kit then tells Man that someone used this plan and lost $300,000 last week, to which Man says that the person deserved it. Kit finally reveals that the person is him, much to Man's dismay upon realising that the newly gained winnings from Ching is all gone. Both Man and Kit express disappointment as the screen credits roll.

Cast
Michael Hui as Man
Sam Hui as Kit
Ricky Hui as Gambler at beach
Betty Ting Pei as Pei-pei
Lisa Lui as Siu-mei
Roy Chiao as Man at milk bar getting parking ticket
James Wong as Wong But-man
Benz Hui as Bully
Law Lan as Man's wife
Dean Shek as Casino clerk
Sammo Hung as Beach rascal
Cheng Kwan-mun
Lee Kwan as Naked man in hotel room
Chan Lap-ban as Blackjack gambler
Chin Tsi-ang as Blackjack gambler
Ho Pak-kwong as Jailer
Fung Ging-man as Ching's dice croupier

Partial soundtrack
Gwai ma seung sing is the debut Cantonese album by Hong Kong actor and singer Samuel Hui, released in 1974 by Polydor Records. The first two tracks are heard in the film and also released in the separate 7" vinyl.

References

Notes

External links

1974 films
1974 comedy films
Hong Kong slapstick comedy films
Films about gambling
1970s Cantonese-language films
Films directed by Michael Hui
Golden Harvest films
Films set in Hong Kong
Films shot in Hong Kong
1974 directorial debut films
1970s Hong Kong films